The 2016 Tajik Cup was the 25th edition of the Tajik Cup. The cup winner qualified for the 2017 AFC Cup.

Last 16

Quarterfinal

Semifinals

Final

Scorers

References

External links
Tajikistan Football Federation

Tajikistan Cup
Tajikistan
Tajik Cup